The 2018 Ladbrokes World Grand Prix was a professional ranking snooker tournament, taking place from 19 to 25 February 2018 at the Guild Hall in Preston, England. It was the fifteenth ranking event of the 2017/2018 season.

Barry Hawkins was the defending champion, but he did not qualify for this edition of the tournament.

Ronnie O'Sullivan won his fourth ranking title of the season and 32nd ranking title overall, beating Ding Junhui 10–3 in the final.

Prize fund
The breakdown of prize money for this year is shown below:

 Winner: £100,000
 Runner-up: £40,000
 Semi-final: £20,000
 Quarter-final: £12,500
 Last 16: £7,500
 Last 32: £5,000

 Highest break: £5,000
 Total: £375,000

The "rolling 147 prize" for a maximum break stood at £15,000

Seeding list

The top 32 players on the one-year ranking list, running from the 2017 Riga Masters until the 2018 Snooker Shoot Out, qualified for the tournament.

Main draw

Final

Century breaks
Total: 26

 140  Mark Joyce
 134, 134, 117, 104  Ding Junhui
 134  Mark Selby
 130  Martin Gould
 128, 124, 121, 120, 119, 106, 105, 105, 102, 101  Ronnie O'Sullivan
 125, 102  Anthony McGill
 123, 105  Shaun Murphy
 122  Yan Bingtao
 111  Ryan Day
 109  Graeme Dott
 103  Stephen Maguire
 102  Neil Robertson

References

External links
 Ladbrokes World Grand Prix 2018, Draw
 Ladbrokes World Grand Prix 2018, Sessions

2018
2018 in snooker
2018 in English sport
2018
2018
February 2018 sports events in the United Kingdom